The Saltstraumen Bridge is a cantilever box girder bridge that crosses the Saltstraumen strait between the islands of Knaplundsøya and Straumøya in Bodø Municipality in Nordland county, Norway.  The bridge spans across the Saltfjorden from the town of Bodø.

The bridge is made of prestressed concrete. Saltstraumen Bridge was opened in 1978.

See also
List of bridges in Norway
List of bridges in Norway by length
List of bridges
List of bridges by length

References

External links

Photo of the bridge

Buildings and structures in Bodø
Road bridges in Nordland
Bridges completed in 1978
1978 establishments in Norway
Norwegian County Road 17